The Marshall Thundering Herd college football team compete as part of the National Collegiate Athletic Association (NCAA) Division I Football Bowl Subdivision, representing Marshall University in the East Division of the Sun Belt Conference (SBC). Marshall has played their home games at Joan C. Edwards Stadium in Huntington, West Virginia since 1991. The team's current head coach is Charles Huff, who was hired in January 2021.

The Thundering fielded their first team in 1895. They have played 122 seasons of football, compiling a record of 584–528–47 and winning 13 conference championships (12 outright). The Thundering Herd appeared in 18 bowl games, compiling a 13–5 record, and they appeared in the NCAA Division I-AA playoffs eight times, winning two national championships (1992 and 1996).

Seasons

Notes

References

 
Marshall Thundering Herd
Marshall Thundering Herd football seasons